"Diary of a Nurse" is an American television play broadcast on May 7, 1959 as part of the CBS television series, Playhouse 90.  The cast includes Inger Stevens, Victor Jory, and Mary Astor. David Greene was the director and Arthur Hailey the writer.

Plot
A student nurse at a large hospital tries to help a patient scheduled for surgery and who declines to cooperate with the doctors. She is caught in a conflict between modern nursing practices and patients' need for human and emotional involvement.

Cast
The cast includes the following:

 Inger Stevens - Gail Lucas
 Victor Jory - George Bavister
 Mary Astor - Eileen Bavister
 Mildred Dunnock - Elsie Chiapetta
 Adam Kennedy - Chief Resident
 Polly Rowles - Marie Hertzog
 Ben Cooper - Dr. Tony McKlusky
 Suzanne Pleshette - Alex
 Elizabeth Patterson - Mrs. Leeder
 Caroline Kearney - Wendy Crain
 Edward Platt - Dr. Mott
 Claudia Bryar - Mrs. Jackson
 Barbara Pepper - Mrs. O'Hearn
 Susanne Sydney - Doreen
 Sandra Harrison - Flo
 Henry Hunter - Dr. Morelli
 Joe Conley - Hans
 Paul Carr - Chuck
 Tracey Roberts - Miss Isles
 Karen Forer - Jeanie Jackson
 Walter Burke - Mr. Jacoby
 Nolan Leary - Harry O'Hearn
 Joanne Smith - Night Nurse

Production
The program aired on May 7, 1959, on the CBS television series Playhouse 90. Arthur Hailey was the writer and David Greene the director. 

"Gail Lucas", the character name of the student nurse played by Inger Stevens, returned as the character name of the young nurse played by Zina Bethune on the 1962 primetime medical drama The Nurses and by Melinda Cordell on the subsequent same-named 1965 daytime drama.

References

1959 American television episodes
Playhouse 90 (season 3) episodes
1959 television plays